Meharia yakovlevi is a moth in the family Cossidae. It is found in Socotra, Yemen.

References

Moths described in 2010
Meharia
Endemic fauna of Socotra